Gundega Repše (born 1960) is a Latvian writer. She received the Annual Latvian Literature Award in 2000 for her novel Thumbelina (Īkstīte). In 2018, Repše was awarded the Baltic Assembly Literature Award.

References

1960 births
Living people
20th-century Latvian women writers
21st-century Latvian women writers
Latvian women novelists
20th-century novelists
21st-century novelists